Subramaniam s/o Sinniah (6 October 1944 – 5 July 2022), or S. Subramaniam as he was known to his supporters, was a Malaysian politician of Indian origin who was a member of the Malaysian Indian Congress (MIC), a component party of the ruling Barisan Nasional (BN) coalition. He served as the Deputy President of MIC from October 1979 to June 2006. He was the longest-serving officeholder by serving for 27 years. He served as Deputy Minister of Domestic Trade and Consumer Affairs from 1995 to 2004, Parliamentary Secretary of International Trade and Industry from 1991 to 1995 and Parliamentary Secretary of Labour and Manpower from 1974 to 1978 in the BN administration under former Prime Ministers Hussein Onn, Mahathir Mohamad and Abdullah Ahmad Badawi as well as the Member of Parliament (MP) for Segamat from 1982 to 2004 and Damansara from 1974 to 1982.

Political history

When V. Manickavasagam became president of the Malaysian Indian Congress, he decided to introduce new faces to the party in leadership positions. This was the time when Subramaniam, K. Pathmanaban, a Harvard MBA holder, and several others entered the political arena to infuse new blood into MIC, and Manickavasagam gave them preference. They were young, well-educated and ambitious but lacked grassroots experience.

This made Samy Vellu bitter as he was one of the five leaders who dared defy former president V.T. Sambanthan and propel Manickavasagam to the presidency of the party.

Subramaniam, then the Secretary General of MIC, was hand-picked by Manickavasagam to succeed him; however, Samy Vellu fought back, literally, and in 1977 party elections edged over Subramaniam by a mere 26 votes to become the Deputy President of MIC.

When Manickavasagam died suddenly on 12 October 1979, Samy Vellu became the Acting President. But it was a divided party that Samy Vellu took over, with the rank and file on his side, and much of the Indian intelligentsia backing Subramaniam. In the ensuing years, Samy Vellu worked hard to remake MIC in his image. In 1981, Samy Vellu almost moved to sack Subramaniam, but following a 20-minute private talk with the latter, both came to some form of understanding, and peace prevailed in the party for the next five years.

Bad blood with Samy Vellu
Subramaniam is known for not to be in good terms with  MIC's president, Samy Vellu as Subramaniam was dropped as a candidate for the 11th general election by Samy Vellu – three days before nomination day. According to Samy Vellu, Subramaniam has enjoyed his time as a Member of Parliament, parliamentary secretary, and deputy minister, citing "now it was the turn of others to taste such fame."

Subramaniam stood to defend his deputy president post in the 2006 party elections, but Samy Vellu went around campaigning that a vote for Subramaniam was a vote against Samy and that he endorsed Dato' G. Palanivel. In the 2006 party elections, Samy Vellu was eventually returned as president uncontested and Dato' G. Palanivel trumped Subramaniam for the deputy president's post. Samy Vellu's image started to tarnish and he lost ethnic Indian support after Hindu Rights Action Force (HINDRAF) organised a rally on 25 November 2007 in Kuala Lumpur demanding 18 points to prevent further discrimination against ethnic Indians, who had been marginalised for 50 years since the country's independence. As a result of this, Samy Vellu lost the Sungai Siput parliamentary seat.

Only 3 out of 9 MIC candidates for the 12th general election were selected. This was the worst defeat for MIC since the party was formed. However, Samy Vellu claimed that he was not responsible for MIC's loss. According to Australian political analyst, the Indian community did not reject Malaysian Indian congress but only Samy Vellu and his cronies. Many branch members agreed that the next man who can save the party is Dato Subra but the problem arose when the present president is not vacating the post. Many tricky methods and pressure were implied to corrupt Dato Subra's image because this is the only way for Samy Vellu to remain in the post. However, the new generation are educated and broad minded. All the foolish attempts against Dato Subra have been deflected. It is also predicted that Samy Vellu could destroy MIC and lead the Indians into his slavery. According to some political analyst a shift of power will take place soon and Dato Subra will bring a fresh air for Indians. Resignation of MIC youth chief S.A. Vickneswaran is another blow for Samy Vellu. Dato Subra started a blog to communicate with all Indians from all backgrounds. The blog can be found on https://web.archive.org/web/20090817134714/http://datosubra.com/. For 2009 MIC deputy presidency election likely to be held on 12 September and it is a three corner fight between Dato' Subra, Palanivelu and Sothinathan. Some political analyst believe that Sothinathan was planted by Samy Velu to split Dato Subra vote and gain easy win for Palanivel. Dato Palanivel won the deputy post for the second time with a narrow majority.

Maika controversy
Officials said about 900 shareholders including Subramaniam, Samy Vellu and Democratic Action Party member of Parliament M. Kulasegaran attended the Maika (MIC's debt-ridden investment arm) annual general meeting, the first time that such a huge number had turned up in the company's history. Abdul Rashid, the CEO of Maika had a tough time controlling the crowd. One faction aligned with MIC president Samy Vellu and the other with Subramaniam, shouting at each other. Despite the heated exchanges, the meeting went on smoothly, with Abdul Rashid replying to the questions put forward by the various shareholders including DAP's Ipoh Barat MP M. Kulasegaran. At about 1pm, the shareholders were asked to vote on the various resolutions including one calling for the sale of the insurance company Oriental Capital Assurance Berhad (OCAB) for RM129.8 million.

Maika's management claimed that the sale of OCAB would enable the company to clear its outstanding debts and repay the shareholders who wanted to withdraw their investments. Speaking to reporters later, Subramaniam said he was pushed when he tried to put forward a suggestion at the meeting. He said he was not opposed to the sale of OCAB but Maika should give the first option to an Indian community-linked company or cooperative so that its majority stake would remain in the community's hands. Subramaniam then lodged a police report.

Declining health and death

On 5 July 2022, Subramaniam died at 8 pm night at the age of 77 leaving behind his wife Suganthi Guru@Tina Subramaniam, two sons and a daughter. His funeral service was held two days later on 7 July 2022 at his family home in Petaling Jaya, Selangor. According to his son Sunther, Subramaniam died peacefully in his sleep after having been bedridden for 11 years of declining health after suffering a stroke.

Election results

Honours

Honours of Malaysia
  :
  Medal of the Order of the Defender of the Realm (PPN) (1981)
  Commander of the Order of Loyalty to the Crown of Malaysia (PSM) – Tan Sri (2012)
  :
  Companion of the Order of the Crown of Johor (SMJ) (1983)
  Knight Commander of the Order of the Crown of Johor (DPMJ) – Dato' (1989)
  :
  Knight Companion of the Order of Loyalty to Negeri Sembilan (DSNS) – Dato' (1985)

References

1944 births
2022 deaths
Malaysian Hindus
Malaysian people of Indian descent
Malaysian politicians of Tamil descent
Malaysian Indian Congress politicians
Members of the Dewan Negara
Members of the Dewan Rakyat
Medallists of the Order of the Defender of the Realm
Commanders of the Order of Loyalty to the Crown of Malaysia
Knights Commander of the Order of the Crown of Johor